David Alan Clifton Reynolds (born October 1948) is an English author and publisher.

Biography
Reynolds was born in London and worked as a sub-editor of Oz magazine, editorial assistant on the Rationalist Press Association's Humanist journal, and editor of The Freethinker, before graduation from the London School of Economics.  He went on to work in publishing, working at Reader's Digest and becoming a co-founder of Bloomsbury Publishing in 1986. In 1999 he left Bloomsbury to pursue a career as a writer. In 2006 he was a co-founder of Old Street Publishing, of which he is a director.

Freethinker Editor

Reynolds served as editor of the secularist/atheist publication The Freethinker from September 1968 to July 1970, the youngest person to have done so.

According to The Freethinker's historian, Jim Herrick:

He persuaded new writers to contribute, and introduced photographs, interviews and a regular cartoon by Daly. He continued Tribe's determination to keep the Freethinker squarely in touch with the crises of the modern world.  A typically wide-ranging front-page was headed "A Holy Mess" and began: "Egypt and Israel, India and Pakistan, Federal Nigeria and the breakaway 'Biafra', are the prime examples at the present time of strife stemming from deep-seated religious differences" and went on to discuss the situation in Northern Ireland. (19 October 1968)

Publishing

Reynolds was Deputy Managing Director and Publishing Director (non-fiction) for Bloomsbury Publishing, co-founding the company with Chief Executive Nigel Newton, Liz Calder and Alan Wherry.  Reynolds departed in 1999.

Writing

Reynolds's first book, Swan River (2001), was shortlisted for the PEN/Ackerley Prize for Autobiography.

Personal life

Reynolds is married and has three daughters. He lives in London.

Bibliography

 Swan River: a memoir of a family mystery (Picador, 2001)
 Slow Road to Brownsville: A Journey through the Heart of the Old West (Greystone Books, 2014)
 Slow Road to San Francisco: Across the USA from Ocean to Ocean (Muswell Press, 20 Aug. 2020)

References

1948 births
Living people
British writers
British publishers (people)